Theodorus Johannes Maria "Theo" van Els (14 May 1936 – 4 August 2015) was a Dutch academic who served as Rector magnificus of the Radboud University Nijmegen between 1994 and 2000. He was a professor of applied linguistics.

Van Els was born in 1936 in Wanssum, he obtained a degree in English language and literature at the Radboud University Nijmegen in 1961. In 1972, he obtained a PhD at the same university with a dissertation on an 8th-century manuscript of Old English names. In 1979, he became lecturer and two years later professor of applied linguistics.

References

1936 births
2015 deaths
Applied linguists
Linguists from the Netherlands
People from Venray
Radboud University Nijmegen alumni
Academic staff of Radboud University Nijmegen
Rectors of universities in the Netherlands